W. E. Scholz (c. 1800 – September 1866) was a German composer and Kapellmeister / conductor at the court of Prince August zu Hohenlohe-Öhringen in   in Upper Silesia.

Life 
Scholz was born in Breslau and his first names and his year of birth are not known today. He was a pupil of Seyfried in Vienna. In 1838 he was appointed Kapellmeister of the Prince zu Hohenlohe-Öhringen at the court in Schlawentzitz in Upper Silesia.

He composed overtures, symphonies, sonatas, instrumental concertos, masses, art songs and harmony music. He also arranged well-known works for the Hofkapelle in Schlawentzitz. For example Wolfgang Amadeus Mozart's Don Giovanni, Carl Maria von Weber's Oberon and Euryanthe, Gioachino Rossini's Guillaume Tell and Otello, Ludwig van Beethoven's Fidelio and Symphony No. 5, Giuseppe Verdi's Macbeth, Felix Mendelssohn Bartholdy's A Midsummer Night's Dream and Frédéric Chopin's Waltz in E-flat major.

The composer's main tenure dates back to the first half of the nineteenth century as evidenced by some autographs. In the 19th century the works of Scholz were acknowledged in the music magazines.

The Musikalisches Conversationslexikon (1840) describes him as a talented composer. He died in the city of his birth, Breslau.

Works (autographs, selection) 
 Ouvertura No 2 par Scholz 1832 (incomplete)
 Fest Polonaise composed by W. E. Scholz Breslau, 12 January 1834. (incomplete)
  Fest-Overture composed for a large orchestra, arranged for the Fürstlich Hohenlohe-Öhring'sche Hofkapelle by W. E. Scholz, no. 4; Slaventzitz, October 6, 1838; Opus 17; Ms. 1838/39 Scholz.
 No 4. Ouverture to the opera Comet by W. E. Scholz 02.03.1839 (incomplete)
 Marsch 12 March 1839 (incomplete)
 Concert für Posaune und Orchester
 Concert für Oboe F major Schlawentzitz d 14: Debr 1842
 Concert für Clarinett
 Adagio and Rondo für Flöte und Orchester (incomplete)
 Scherzo (incomplete)
 Vier Lieder (Winternacht, Wanderlied, Wär' ich ein Nachtigall, Mein Reichtum) for voice and orchestra (incomplete)

Instrumental concertos 
The scores of the composer's complete instrumental compositions (trombone, oboe and clarinet concertos) were prepared in 2016 by Stefan Antweiler from the instrumental parts and published as first editions by Are Musikverlag Mainz.

Literature 
 Silke Leopold / Bärbel Pelker (Hg.): Süddeutsche Hofkapellen im 18. Jahrhundert. Eine Bestandsaufnahme (Schriften zur Südwestdeutschen Hofmusik 1). Heidelberger Akademie der Wissenschaften. Online Publikation. http://www.hof-musik.de/PDF/SSH1.pdf
 Heckl, Peter: W. A. Mozarts Instrumentalkompositionen in Bearbeitungen für Harmoniemusik vor 1840, Georg Olms Verlag, Hildesheim / New York 2014
 Jon A. Gillaspie, Marshall Stoneham und David Lindsey Clark: The Wind Ensemble Sourcebook & The Wind Ensemble Catalog Westport Conn/London 1997 / 1998
 Felix Loy: Harmoniemusik in der Fürstenbergischen Hofkapelle zu Donaueschingen. Universität Tübingen. Dissertation 2009 http://nbn-resolving.de/urn:nbn:de:bsz:21-opus-55919 http://hdl.handle.net/10900/46891

Sources

External links 
 
 Stefan Antweiler: W. E. Scholz (Life und literature). Are Musikverlag (PDF; 304 KB)

1800s births
1866 deaths
19th-century classical composers
19th-century German composers
German conductors (music)
German male conductors (music)
Composers for trombone
Composers for oboe
Composers for clarinet
19th-century German male musicians